Man in the Moon is the eighth studio album by Nektar and was originally released in 1980 as a German only release. This album continues the commercial hard rock with elements of progressive rock explored on their previous effort Magic Is a Child. This album features the return of founding member Roye Albrighton. The album was expanded to include previously unreleased tracks and re-issued by Voiceprint in Europe.

Track listing

Personnel

 Roye Albrighton – guitars, lead vocals, background vocals
 Allan "Taff" Freeman – keyboards
 Carmine Rojas – bass, keyboards
 David Prater – drums, background vocals

References

External links
 Man in the Moon at TheNektarProject.com

Nektar albums
1980 albums